The 2009 London Marathon was the 29th running of the annual marathon race in London, England, which took place on Sunday, 26 April. The elite men's race was won by Kenya's Samuel Wanjiru in a time of 2:05:10 hours and the women's race was won by Germany's Irina Mikitenko in 2:22:11.

In the wheelchair races, Australia's Kurt Fearnley (1:28:56) and American Amanda McGrory (1:50:39) won the men's and women's divisions, respectively. Fearnley defeated David Weir by one second, taking the Briton's course record in the process.

Around 155,000 people applied to enter the race: 49,995 had their applications accepted and 35,884 started the race. A total of 35,266 runners, 24,228 men and 11,038 women, finished the race.

In the under-17 Mini Marathon, the 3-mile able-bodied and wheelchair events were won by Ronnie Sparke (14:20), Ciara Mageean (16:16), Daniel Lucker (12:30) and Hannah Cockroft (15:42).

Results

Men 

Morocco's Abderrahim Goumri originally placed sixth with a time of 2:08:25 hours, but this was subsequently disqualified due to doping.

Women

Wheelchair men

Wheelchair women

References

Results
Men's results. Association of Road Racing Statisticians. Retrieved 2020-04-12.
Women's results. Association of Road Racing Statisticians. Retrieved 2020-04-12.
Wheelchair results. London Marathon. Retrieved 2020-04-26.

External links

Official website

2009
London Marathon
Marathon
London Marathon